The 2021 Middle Tennessee Blue Raiders football team represented Middle Tennessee State University as a member of the East Division of Conference USA (C-USA) during the 2021 NCAA Division I FBS football season. Led by 16th-year head coach Rick Stockstill, the Blue Raiders compiled an overall record of 7–6 with a mark of 5–4 in conference play, placing fourth in the C-USA's East Division. Middle Tennessee was invited to the  Bahamas Bowl, where they defeated Toledo. The team played home games at Johnny "Red" Floyd Stadium in Murfreesboro, Tennessee.

Previous season

The Blue Raiders finished the 2020 regular season 3–6 and 2–4 in C–USA play to finish in fifth in the East Division. They were not eligible to play in any post season bowl game.

Schedule
Middle Tennessee announced its 2021 football schedule on January 27, 2021.

References

Middle Tennessee
Middle Tennessee Blue Raiders football seasons
Bahamas Bowl champion seasons
Middle Tennessee Blue Raiders football